The 2017 MBC Drama Awards, presented by Munhwa Broadcasting Corporation (MBC) took place on December 30, 2017. It was hosted by Kim Sung-ryung and Oh Sang-jin.

Winners and nominees

Presenters
Actor Kim Sang-joong gave a memorial speech for late Kim Ji-young (1938–2017), late Kim Young-ae (1951–2017), late  (1960–2017) and late Kim Joo-hyuk (1972–2017).

Special performances

See also
2017 KBS Drama Awards
2017 SBS Drama Awards

References

External links

2017 television awards
MBC Drama Awards
2017 in South Korean television